Judicial reform is the complete or partial political reform of a country's judiciary. Judicial reform is often done as a part of wider reform of the country's political system or a legal reform.

Areas of the judicial reform often include: codification of law instead of common law, moving from an inquisitorial system to an adversarial system, establishing stronger judicial independence with judicial councils or changes to appointment procedure, establishing mandatory retirement age for judges or  enhancing independence of prosecution.

Examples
 Judicial reform of Alexander II
 Romanian judicial reform

See also
Constitutionalism
Constitutional economics
Criminal justice reform
Judiciary
Independence of the judiciary
Judiciary in Russia
Legal reform
Rule of law
Rule according to higher law
Separation of powers

Notes

External links
Judicial reform in Europe
Prashant Bhushan led Campaign for Judicial Accountability & Reforms in India, world's largest democracy
Dr. Richard Cordero's website on Judicial Reforms Research & Actionable Strategy in USA
The Association for Judicial Reforms (India) working for Judicial Transparency and Efficiency in Administration of Justice in India

Reform